Tashk (also Romanized as Ţashk) is a village in Abadeh Tashk Rural District, Abadeh Tashk District, Neyriz County, Fars Province, Iran. At the 2006 census, its population was 577, in 170 families.

References 

Populated places in Abadeh Tashk County